I.D. is a historical drama by Antony Sher. It debuted on 4 September 2003 at London's Almeida Theatre, directed by Nancy Meckler.

The play is adapted from the book A Mouthful of Glass by Henk van Woerden, and follows the events surrounding the trial and imprisonment of the mentally unstable Demetrios Tsafendas, who in 1966 assassinated South African Prime Minister Hendrik Verwoerd.

Original cast
The original cast included:
Jon Cartwright as Gavronsky, Buytendag, Gomez
Jonathan Duff as Pratt, Muller, Dr. Fisher
Alex Ferns as Lintwurm
Paul Herzberg as John Vorster, Kriel
Peter Landi as Father Daniels, Manolis
Lucian Msamati as Sipho
Oscar Pierce as City Gent, Schalk, Nikki, Junior Clerk
Antony Sher as Demetrios Tsafendas
Cleo Sylvestre as Helen Daniels, Daisy
Christopher Wells as Frank Waring, Judge Pienaar
Marius Weyers as Hendrik Verwoerd
Jennifer Woodburne as Betsie Verwoerd

Other original production credits
Author: Antony Sher
Director: Nancy Meckler
Composer: Ilona Sekacz
Set Design: Katrina Lindsay
Lighting: Johanna Town
Choreographer: Scarlett Mackmin
Sound: John Leonard
South Africa Music Consultant: Sello Maake ka Ncube

Other productions
I.D. had its New Zealand premiere at BATS Theatre in Wellington on 4 October 2005, starring Malcolm Murray as Tsafendas, Benjamin Fransham as Verwoerd and Alex Greig as Lintwurm. The cast also included Erin Banks, Miria George, Salesi Le'ota, Hadleigh Walker, James Stewart and Tony Hopkins. It was produced by The Bacchanals and directed by David Lawrence. At the 2005 Chapman Tripp Theatre Awards I.D. won the awards for Production of the Year, Director of the Year, Actor of the Year (Malcolm Murray) and Supporting Actor of the Year (Alex Greig).

References

2003 plays